The 2017 Dubai 24 Hour was the 12th running of the Dubai 24 Hour endurance race. It took place at the Dubai Autodrome in Dubai, United Arab Emirates, and ran between 11–13 January 2017.

Race result
Class Winners in bold.

Fastest Laps 
A6-Pro: Y. Buurman (Black Falcon, Mercedes AMG GT3): 1:59.198

A6-Am: B. Schneider (HTP Motorsport, Mercedes AMG GT3): 2:00.464

SPX: T. Dyer (COOL RACING BY GPC MOTORSPORT, Vortex 1.0): 2:03.117

991: K. Bachier (race:pro motorsport, Porsche 991 Cup): 2:05.060

SP2: J. van Lagen (Bovi Motorsport, Brokernet Silver Sting): 2:06.067

SP3-GT4: J. Mardenborough (Nissan GT Academy Team RJN, Nissan 370Z GT4): 2:10.180

TCR: M. Beche (Modena Motorsports, Seat Leon TCR V2 SEQ): 2:12.889

A3: S. D'Aste (PB Racing, Lotus Elise Cup PB-R): 2:16.947

CUP1: J. de los Milagros (Sorg Rennsport, BMW M235i Racing Cup): 2:19.228

A2: A. Mollison (Stanco & Tanner Motorsport, Renault Clio Cup IV): 2:21.765

References

External links
 

Dubai 24 Hour
Dubai 24 Hour
Dubai 24 Hour
Dubai 24 Hour